Cold Springs is a census-designated place (CDP) in Washoe County, Nevada, United States. It is known as Eitse'ihpaa or Eitse'ippaa (literally "cold water" or "cold spring") in Shoshoni. It is located just off U.S. Route 395 in the northwestern part of the Reno–Sparks Metropolitan Statistical Area, adjacent to the California state line. The population was 8,544 at the 2010 census.

Geography
Cold Springs is located at  (39.676916, -119.967643).

Demographics

As of the census of 2000, there were 3,834 people, 1,316 households, and 1,038 families residing in the CDP. The population density was 224.2 people per square mile (86.6/km2). There were 1,382 housing units at an average density of 80.8 per square mile (31.2/km2). The racial makeup of the CDP was 92.6% White, 1.2% African American, 1.2% Native American, 1.1% Asian, 0.1% Pacific Islander, 0.8% from other races, and 2
3.0% from two or more races. Hispanic or Latino of any race were 4.4% of the population.

There were 1,316 households, out of which 43.7% had children under the age of 18 living with them, 64.0% were married couples living together, 7.9% had a female householder with no husband present, and 21.1% were non-families. 14.1% of all households were made up of individuals, and 3.0% had someone living alone who was 65 years of age or older. The average household size was 2.91 and the average family size was 3.23.

In the CDP, the population was spread out, with 31.3% under the age of 18, 4.6% from 18 to 24, 34.3% from 25 to 44, 24.2% from 45 to 64, and 5.6% who were 65 years of age or older. The median age was 35 years. For every 100 females, there were 104.4 males. For every 100 females age 18 and over, there were 104.0 males.

The median income for a household in the CDP was $54,511, and the median income for a family was $55,930. Males had a median income of $41,425 versus $27,402 for females. The per capita income for the CDP was $20,561. About 4.6% of families and 4.4% of the population were below the poverty line, including 2.5% of those under age 18 and 9.0% of those age 65 or over.

In 2004, 17 landowners convinced the Reno City Council to annex several thousand acres of Cold Springs Valley, over the protests of a majority of long-time residents. Developers are planning to build several thousand houses and an industrial park in Cold Springs Valley. The resulting change from a semi-rural environment to a more industrialized, suburban one has some local residents upset.

See also

 List of census-designated places in Nevada

References

External links

Census-designated places in Nevada
Census-designated places in Washoe County, Nevada
Reno, NV Metropolitan Statistical Area